On Green Dolphin Street is an album by saxophonist Archie Shepp recorded in 1977 for the Japanese Denon label.

Reception

AllMusic stated: "The fact that Shepp is playing against such a conventional acoustic jazz backdrop gives On Green Dolphin Street its unique tension. The accompanists are a tamer group, working closer to the framework the songs provide. Still, Joe Chambers (drums), Sam Jones (bass), and Walter Bishop, Jr. (piano) are a sophisticated rhythm section managing to balance this with an adept flexibility. Shepp's unique voice breathes new life into these standards, paying them the ultimate compliment; On Green Dolphin Street argues and convinces that these songs deserve to be sung again".

Track listing
All compositions by Archie Shepp except where noted.
 "On Green Dolphin Street" (Bronisław Kaper, Ned Washington) – 7:58
 "Enough" – 6:39
 "The Scene Is Clean" (Tadd Dameron) – 6:32
 "In a Mellow Blues" – 11:19
 "I Thought About You" (Jimmy Van Heusen, Johnny Mercer) – 9:36

Personnel 
Archie Shepp – tenor saxophone, soprano saxophone
Walter Bishop Jr. – piano 
Sam Jones – bass
Joe Chambers – drums

References 

1978 albums
Archie Shepp albums
Denon Records albums